Object Lessons is the first novel by Pulitzer Prize-winning novelist and journalist Anna Quindlen. First published in 1991, the novel is a coming-of-age story centering on 13-year-old Maggie Scanlan, the youngest child of the powerful Scanlan clan.

The title is drawn from "object lesson," a teaching method.

1991 American novels